Gene is a given name, often a short form (hypocorism) of Eugene.

Notable people with the name include:

Gene

Men
 Gene Bradley (born 1957), American football player
 Gene Hackman (born 1930), American actor
 Gene Makowsky, Canadian Football League player
 Gene Miles, Australian rugby league footballer
 Gene Moore (window dresser) (1910–1998), American designer and store window dresser
 Gene Noble, American singer and songwriter
 Gene Pitney (1940–2006), American singer-songwriter
 Gene Rayburn (1917-1999), American radio and television personality
 Gene Robillard, Canadian football player
 Gene Samuel, Trinidad and Tobago road bicycle racer and track cyclist
 Gene Siskel (1946–1999), American film critic
 Gene Smith (athletic director), athletic director at Ohio State University
 Gene Stuart, (1944-2016), Irish singer
 Gene Weingarten (born 1951), American humor writer and journalist
 Gene Wolfe (1931–2019), American science fiction author

Women
 Genė Galinytė (born 1945), Lithuanian rower
 Gene Miles (activist) (1930–1972), political activist from Trinidad and Tobago
 Gene Tierney (1920–1991), American film and stage actress

Eugene
 Gene Cockrell (born 1934), American football player
 Gene Filipski (1931–1994), American football player
 Gene Gotti (born 1946), Italian-American mobster
 Gene Kranz (born 1933), American aerospace engineer and NASA Flight Director and manager
 Gene Moore (outfielder), right fielder in Major League Baseball
 Gene Moore (pitcher), left-handed pitcher in Major League Baseball
 Gene Moore (basketball) (born 1945), American Basketball Association player
 Gene Okerlund, American professional wrestling announcer
 Gene Prebola, American football player
 Gene Snitsky, American professional wrestler who formerly performed for World Wrestling Entertainment
 Gene Upshaw, NFL Hall of Fame guard and former NFL Players Association director

Eugenio
 Gene Sarazen (1902–1999), American golfer born Eugenio Saraceni

English-language given names
Hypocorisms